Andres Manuel Labrada (born 1989) is an American comics artist known for his work for publishers such as Marvel Comics and Dynamite Entertainment. He has done illustrations for Red Sonja, Dejah Thoris, and Hulk and the Agents of S.M.A.S.H.

Early life 
Labrada was born in 1989 and grew up in Miami, Florida with his parents and younger brothers. He began his professional comics career at age 25 as an intern for Blondie and Dagwood. He attended Ringling college of Art and graduated with a degree in Fine Arts with a major in Illustration.

Career 
Labrada began his comics career in 2013 as an intern on Blondie and Dagwood. His first credited artwork was as a storyboard and clean up artist for Hulk and the Agents of S.M.A.S.H episodes 3 and 5. Following his internship at Blondie, Labrada published his first sequential pages with Creature Entertainment in The Gun #2. He went on to work on various cover art and sequential pages for Boom Studios, Dynamite Comics, Marvel, Image, and Z2 Comics.

Bibliography

Self-published 

 COSHOHO #1-?

Interior work

Creature Entertainment 

 The Gun #2
 The Gun #4

Dynamite Entertainment 

 Vampirella Valentines Special 2022
 Red Sonja Black White and Red #7 (written by Amy Chu)
 Hell Sonja #5 
 Red Sonja: Fairy Tales
 Dejah Thoris: Fairy Tales

Z2 Comics 

 Agnez Mo Presents: Don't Wake Up

Cover work

Boom! Studios 

 Something is Killing the Children #16
 Something is Killing the Children #25
 Mighty Morphin #4
 We Only Find Them When They're Dead #1

Creature Entertainment 

 The Gun #4

Image Comics 

 Nocterra #1

See also 

 List of cartoonists
 Comic book
 History of American comics

References 

Comics artists
American comics